Ebersole is a surname of Swiss German origin with the meaning "boar ground". Eversole, Ebersol and Ebersold are other spellings of this name. Ebersol and Ebersole also occur among Mennonites and the Amish. It may refer to:

 Brian Ebersole (born 1980), American mixed martial artist
 Christine Ebersole (born 1953), American actress and singer
 Frank Ebersole (1919-2009), American philosopher
 Hal Ebersole (1899–1984), American football player
 John Ebersole (American football) (born 1948), American former National Football League player
 John H. Ebersole (1925–1993) American pioneer in submarine medicine and radiation oncology, Captain US Navy
 John Ebersole (educator) (1944–2016), American educator, author and columnist
 Lucinda Ebersole, critic, editor and fiction writer
 Mark C. Ebersole, American academic
 P. David Ebersole (born 1964), American television director and filmmaker

See also

 Dick Ebersol (born 1947), American television executive
 Eversole (disambiguation)

References